Boiler insurance (Boiler cover) is a type of insurance that covers repairs and in some instances, the replacement of a home boiler. It can also cover other parts of the central heating system and even plumbing and electrics.

Types of boiler coverage
More than 22 million UK households rely on a boiler for their heating and hot water. But boilers are not usually covered by standard home insurance and can be very costly to repair or replace. An owner of a building may purchase boiler insurance. Coverage is negotiated between the insurance carrier and may include the boiler only, piping system, or the full heating system. Some insurance carriers also offer annual service packages.

The most costly coverage will include the full central heating system. Insurance is generally offered by gas and electric energy providers, although other companies also provide cover. Policies have various restrictions on time of work, and cost of repairs. Old equipment may not be insurable.

Boiler cover however is not boiler insurance. Boiler cover is much more limited and has very strict guidelines on the amounts paid out towards repairs and new boilers. Insurance is regulated, whereas boiler cover is not. Boiler cover is generally cheaper and will cover most issues that arise with most boilers.

References

Types of insurance
Boilers